Korwin Jay "Kory" DeHaan (born July 16, 1976) is a former Major League Baseball outfielder.  He is an alumnus of Morningside College.

Drafted by the Pittsburgh Pirates in the 7th round of the 1997 MLB amateur draft, DeHaan would make his Major League Baseball debut with the San Diego Padres on April 25, 2000, and appear in his final game during on September 29, 2002.

Currently, he is the batting coach of the Bradenton Marauders.

Minor league coach
DeHaan became the interim manager for the Golden Baseball League's Chico Outlaws after starting the 2009 season as hitting coach.  He replaced Greg Cadaret on July 24, 2009, who was fired that day. In December 2009, he left the Outlaws to accept the job as hitting coach for the Padres' rookie league club in Peoria, Arizona.

On December 1, 2011, DeHaan was named as a coach for the Pirates' High-A affiliate, the Bradenton Marauders.

References

External links

 
 Managers and Coaches at Chico Outlaws website

1976 births
Living people
People from Peoria, Arizona
People from Pella, Iowa
Sportspeople from the Phoenix metropolitan area
Baseball players from Iowa
San Diego Padres players
Major League Baseball right fielders
Morningside Mustangs baseball players
Erie SeaWolves players
Augusta GreenJackets players
Altoona Curve players
Lynchburg Hillcats players
Rancho Cucamonga Quakes players
Las Vegas Stars (baseball) players
Mobile BayBears players
Portland Beavers players
Minor league baseball coaches
Minor league baseball managers